Semere Russom (born July 27, 1943) began his professional life as a teacher. He traveled to the United States as a student at the University of Oklahoma, but terminated his studies in 1976 to serve in the Eritrean People's Liberation Front.

After Eritrea's independence he served as Eritrean Ambassador to the United States and Canada. Afterwards he continued his career in public service as Director of European Affairs in the Eritrea Ministry of Foreign Affairs until 2001.

On 1 January 2002, he left the Ministry of Foreign Affairs to become the Mayor of Asmara and the Administrator of the Central Region of Eritrea. In April 2007 he was appointed to head the Ministry of Education while continuing service as the Mayor and Administrator of Asmara, and the Central Region respectively.

On July 21, 2018, he was appointed as the Eritrean Ambassador to Ethiopia, shortly after bilateral ties were restored between the countries.

References

1943 births
Living people
Eritrean diplomats
People's Front for Democracy and Justice politicians
Government ministers of Eritrea
University of Oklahoma alumni
Mayors of places in Eritrea
Ambassadors of Eritrea to Canada
Ambassadors of Eritrea to the United States